On Our Own is an American sitcom broadcast Sundays at 8:30 pm (EST) on CBS as part of their 1977–78 schedule. It featured Lynnie Greene as Maria Bonino and Bess Armstrong as Julia Peters, two employees in the Bedford Advertising Agency in New York City who also share an apartment. Toni McBain (Gretchen Wyler) was their boss, while April Baxter (Dixie Carter) and Phil Goldstein were their coworkers.

The show aired from October 9, 1977, until April 30, 1978.

Cast
Lynnie Greene as Maria Teresa Bonino
Bess Armstrong as Julia Peters
Gretchen Wyler as Toni McBain
Dixie Carter as April Baxter
Dan Resin as Craig Boatwright
John Christopher Jones as Eddie Barnes
Bob Randall as J.M. Bedford

Production
On Our Own was shot at CBS studios in Manhattan and edited at Unitel. The editor was Frank Herold. The show was videotaped on location in New York in front of a live audience, which was unusual for a show of its genre during the late 1970s, as most sitcoms were taped in Hollywood.

Episodes

References

External links

1977 American television series debuts
1978 American television series endings
1970s American sitcoms
CBS original programming
Television shows set in New York City
Television series by Warner Bros. Television Studios
English-language television shows